Guts is a 2009 Spanish crime drama film starring Hugo Silva and Carmelo Gómez.

Plot

Cast
 Hugo Silva as Sebas
 Carmelo Gómez as Regueira
 Celso Bugallo as Raúl
 Carlos Sante as Antonio
 Mabel Rivera as Aunt Elvira
 Xavier Estévez as Couto
 Rula Blanco as Isolina
 Tomás Lijó as Manu
 Pepe Suevos as Domingo
 Alfonso Agra as Severo
 Yoíma Valdés as Rosa

Production
The film was shot on location in Galicia in August and September 2008.

Reception
The film's premiere was held at the Proyecciones Cinema in Madrid, Spain on September 3, 2009. Agallas opened in 180 theaters across Spain on August 4, 2009, and the film ranked ninth at the weekend box office with an opening gross of €280,000.

See also 
 List of Spanish films of 2009

References

External links 
 
 

2009 films
2000s Spanish-language films
2009 crime drama films
Spanish crime drama films
2000s Spanish films